Sine Hovesen (born 19 August 1987) is a Danish football midfielder. She plays for Fortuna Hjørring in the Elitedivisionen.

Club career
She played for Fortuna Hjørring since 2007.

International career
Hovesen made her senior Denmark debut at the 2008 Algarve Cup, in a 1–0 win over Germany. She was called up to be part of the national team for the UEFA Women's Euro 2013.

Honours

Club
Fortuna Hjørring
Winner
 Elitedivisionen: 2009–10

Runner-up
 Elitedivisionen: 2011–12, 2012–13
 Danish Women's Cup: 2012–13

References

External links
 
 Profile at soccerdonna.de
 
 

1987 births
Living people
Danish women's footballers
Denmark women's international footballers
Fortuna Hjørring players
Women's association football midfielders